President of the National Assembly may refer to:
President of the National Assembly of Armenia
President of the National Assembly of Artsakh
President of the National Assembly of Cambodia
President of the National Assembly of Ecuador
President of the National Assembly of France
President of the National Assembly of Laos
President of the National Assembly of Quebec, Canada
President of the National Assembly of Serbia
President of the National Assembly of Slovenia
President of the National Assembly of Thailand
President of the National Assembly of Venezuela